Ilija Temelkovski is the current coach of RK Tineks Prolet. He led Macedonia to an 11th-place finish at the 2009 World Men's Handball Championship in Croatia. And in 2016 he returned in the national team now as an assistant.

References

Living people
Macedonian handball coaches
National team coaches
Year of birth missing (living people)
Place of birth missing (living people)
21st-century Macedonian people